This is a list of Members of Parliament nominated to the English parliament convened by Oliver Cromwell in 1653.

This Parliament was called the "Little Parliament", as no burgesses (representatives of cities and boroughs) were summoned to it except from the City of London. It did however include a small number of representatives for Scotland and Ireland. Given its skeletal nature, it was nicknamed the Barebone's Parliament after Praise-God Barebone one of the representatives for the City of London. The parliament first met on 5 July 1653 and sat until 12 December 1653.

List of constituencies and members

This list contains details of the Members nominated by Oliver Cromwell and the Army Council in 1653. There were no elections.

Total of 140 (England and Wales 129, Scotland 5, Ireland 6), with an additional six nominated by the assembly.

See also
Barebone's Parliament

Notes

References

Further reading
 
 

1653 in England
1653 in politics
17th-century English parliaments
 
1653